Filmfare Awards South is the South Indian segment of the annual Filmfare Awards, presented by the Filmfare magazine of The Times Group to honour both artistic and technical excellence of professionals in the Indian film industry encompassing four languages, namely, Tamil, Telugu, Malayalam and Kannada. They were introduced in 1954, around the films released in 1952-53 and Filmfare Awards initially recognizing the Hindi film industry. In 1964 awards were extended in Tamil, Telugu, Bengali  and Marathi, around the films released in 1963. The inclusion of the Malayalam cinema in the awards came in 1967 while Kannada cinema was recognized in 1970. Each industry is given its own set of creative awards in annual ceremonies that have predominantly been held in Hyderabad and Chennai. Before 1976, the Awards ceremony was held in Mumbai along with Hindi awards. From 1976, Southern region film awards were separated from Hindi and moved to Chennai. Kamal Haasan and Uday Kiran hold the record for being the youngest to win the Best Actor award.

History 
The awards were first given in 1953 and the ceremony used to be held along with Bollywood Filmfare Awards. The awards were being held in the Kalaivanar Arangam, Chennai in the early days. Later the ceremony shifted to the distinctive Music Academy.

In 1953 initially recognizing the Hindi film industry. In 1963 Awards extended to Best Picture in Telugu, Tamil, Bengali & Marathi, for the awards and from 1966 Malayalam films were added. Kannada films became a part of the event in 1969. In 1972 the awards were extended to Best Actor, Best Actress and Best Director categories in all south Indian films. The categories for Special Awards were introduced in the 1980s and Best Music Direction in 1990s. Lifetime Achievement Award – South was first given in 1983. Award for Best Male debut and Female debut were given irregularly during the same period. Categories for Best Male Playback Singing and Best Female Playback Singing were introduced in 1997. In 2002, awards for Best Supporting actors were given for Telugu and Tamil films. Since 2005, these awards were extended to the Malayalam and Kannada film industries. In the same year, additional categories such as Best Lyricist, Best Playback Singing were also introduced. Awards for Best Comedian were given from 2002 till 2006 and discontinued later.

Statuette 
The statuette, depicting a woman whose arms uprise in a dance number with her fingers touching, is commonly referred to as "Black Lady" (or "The Lady in Black"). Originally designed by N.G. Pansare under the supervision of The Times of Indias art director Walter Langhammer, it is generally made of bronze, its height is 46.5 cm and it weighs around five kg.

To celebrate the 25th year of the awards, the statues were made in silver and to celebrate the 50th year the statues were made in gold.

 The Red Carpet 
The Red Carpet is a segment that takes place before the beginning of the actual ceremony. This is where actors, actresses, producers, directors, singers, composers, and others that have contributed to Indian cinema are introduced. Hosts question the celebrities about upcoming performances and who they think deserves to take the Black Lady home.

 Superlatives 

 Records Most Awards for a filmMost Awards for Best DirectorMost Awards for Best ActorMost Awards for Best ActressMost Awards for Best Actor - CriticsMost Awards for Best Actress - CriticsMost Awards for Best Supporting ActorMost Awards for Best Supporting ActressMost Awards for Music DirectionMost Awards for Male SingerMost Awards for Female Singer'

Award Categories 
As of 2006, there are a total of 10 categories across each of the four film industries.

Creative awards

Tamil cinema 
Filmfare Award for Best Film – Tamil: since 1963
Filmfare Award for Best Director – Tamil: since 1972
Filmfare Award for Best Actor – Tamil: since 1972
Filmfare Award for Best Actress – Tamil: since 1972
Filmfare Award for Best Supporting Actor – Tamil: since 2002
Filmfare Award for Best Supporting Actress – Tamil: since 2002
Filmfare Award for Best Music Director – Tamil: since 1990
Filmfare Award for Best Lyricist – Tamil: since 2005
Filmfare Award for Best Male Playback Singer – Tamil: since 2005
Filmfare Award for Best Female Playback Singer – Tamil: since 1999

Telugu cinema 
 Filmfare Award for Best Film – Telugu: since 1963
 Filmfare Award for Best Director – Telugu: since 1972
 Filmfare Award for Best Actor – Telugu: since 1972
 Filmfare Award for Best Actress – Telugu: since 1972
 Filmfare Award for Best Supporting Actor – Telugu: since 2002
 Filmfare Award for Best Supporting Actress – Telugu: since 2002
 Filmfare Award for Best Music Director – Telugu: since 1990
 Filmfare Award for Best Lyricist – Telugu: since 2005
 Filmfare Award for Best Male Playback Singer – Telugu: Since 1997
 Filmfare Award for Best Female Playback Singer – Telugu: since 2004

Malayalam cinema
 Filmfare Award for Best Film – Malayalam: since 1966
 Filmfare Award for Best Director – Malayalam: since 1972
 Filmfare Award for Best Actor – Malayalam: since 1972
 Filmfare Award for Best Actress – Malayalam: since 1972
 Filmfare Award for Best Supporting Actor – Malayalam: since 2006
 Filmfare Award for Best Supporting Actress – Malayalam: since 2006
 Filmfare Award for Best Music Director – Malayalam: since 1990
 Filmfare Award for Best Lyricist – Malayalam: since 2006
 Filmfare Award for Best Male Playback Singer – Malayalam: since 2006
 Filmfare Award for Best Female Playback Singer – Malayalam: since 2006

Kannada cinema 
 Filmfare Award for Best Film – Kannada: since 1970
 Filmfare Award for Best Director – Kannada: since 1972
 Filmfare Award for Best Actor – Kannada: since 1972
 Filmfare Award for Best Actress – Kannada: since 1972
 Filmfare Award for Best Supporting Actor – Kannada: since 2006
 Filmfare Award for Best Supporting Actress – Kannada: since 2006
 Filmfare Award for Best Music Director – Kannada: since 1990
 Filmfare Award for Best Lyricist – Kannada: since 2006
 Filmfare Award for Best Male Playback Singer – Kannada: since 2006
 Filmfare Award for Best Female Playback Singer – Kannada: since 2006

Technical awards 
 Filmfare Award for Best Art Director – South: since 1998
 Filmfare Award for Best Cinematographer – South: since 1997
 Filmfare Award for Best Dance Choreographer – South: since 1997
 Filmfare Award for Best Action Director – South: since 2005
 Filmfare Award for Best Editor – South: since 2005
 Filmfare Award for Best Costume Design – South : since 2010
 Filmfare Award for Best Special Effects – South: since 2012

Special awards 
 Filmfare Special Award – South: Since 1972
 Filmfare Critics Award for Best Actor – South: since 2011
Filmfare Critics Award for Best Actress – South: since 2015
 Filmfare Award for Best Male Debut – South: since 2000
 Filmfare Award for Best Female Debut – South: since 1997
 Filmfare Lifetime Achievement Award – South: since 1983

Retired awards 
 Filmfare Award for Best Comedian – Telugu: 2002 to 2005
 Filmfare Award for Best Comedian – Tamil: 2002 to 2006
 Filmfare Award for Best Villain – Telugu: 2002 to 2005
 Filmfare Award for Best Villain – Tamil: 2002 to 2005

Ceremonies 
 67th Filmfare Awards South, held on 9 October 2022 Bangalore, Karnataka
 66th Filmfare Awards South, held on 21 December 2019 Chennai, Tamil Nadu
 65th Filmfare Awards South, held 16 June 2018 in Hyderabad, Telangana
 64th Filmfare Awards South, held 17 June 2017 in Hyderabad, Telangana
 63rd Filmfare Awards South, held 18 June 2016 in Hyderabad, Telangana
 62nd Filmfare Awards South, held 26 June 2015 in Chennai, Tamil Nadu
 61st Filmfare Awards South, held 12 July 2014 in Chennai, Tamil Nadu
 60th Filmfare Awards South, held 20 July 2013 in Hyderabad, Andhra Pradesh
 59th Filmfare Awards South, held 7 July 2012 in Chennai, Tamil Nadu
 58th Filmfare Awards South, held 2 July 2011 in Hyderabad, Andhra Pradesh
 57th Filmfare Awards South, held 7 August 2010 in Chennai, Tamil Nadu
 56th Filmfare Awards South, held 31 July 2009 in Hyderabad, Andhra Pradesh
 52nd Filmfare Awards South, held 23 July 2005 in Hyderabad, Andhra Pradesh
 51st Filmfare Awards South, 12 June 2004 in Chennai, Tamil Nadu
 49th Filmfare Awards South, held 20 April 2002 in Chennai, Tamil Nadu
 45th Filmfare Awards South, held 13 June 1998 in Madras, Tamil Nadu
 42nd Filmfare Awards South, held 23 September 1995 in Madras, Tamil Nadu
 41st Filmfare Awards South, held 24 September 1994 in Madras, Tamil Nadu
 40th Filmfare Awards South, held 13 October 1993 in Madras, Tamil Nadu
 38th Filmfare Awards South, held 11 August 1991 in Madras, Tamil Nadu
 36th Filmfare Awards South, held 13 August 1989 in Madras, Tamil Nadu
 34th Filmfare Awards South, held 9 August 1987 in Madras, Tamil Nadu
 33rd Filmfare Awards South, held 10 August 1986 in Madras, Tamil Nadu
 27th Filmfare Awards South, held 6 July 1980 in Madras, Tamil Nadu
 26th Filmfare Awards South, held 10 June 1979 in Madras, Tamil Nadu
 24th Filmfare Awards South, held 14 August 1977 in Madras, Tamil Nadu
 22nd Filmfare Awards South, held 30 March 1975 in Bombay, Maharastra
 21st Filmfare Awards South, held 11 April 1974 in Bombay, Maharastra
 20th Filmfare Awards South, held 21 April 1973 in Bombay, Maharastra
 19th Filmfare Awards South, held 24 March 1972 in Bombay, Maharastra
 18th Filmfare Awards South, held 18 April 1971 in Bombay, Maharastra
 17th Filmfare Awards South, held 19 April 1970 in Bombay, Maharastra
 11th Filmfare Awards South, held 1964 in Bombay, Maharastra

References

External links 

 
 Filmfare Awards South 2018 | List of Kannada Filmfare Award Winners
 Filmfare Awards South 2018 | List of Telugu Filmfare Award Winners
 Filmfare Awards South 2018 | List of Malayalam Filmfare Award Winners
 Filmfare Awards South 2018 | List of Tamil Filmfare Award Winners
 

 

Indian film awards
Events of The Times Group
Awards established in 1964
1964 establishments in Madras State
South India
Filmfare Awards South winners
Cinema of Andhra Pradesh
Telugu film awards